Georges Mikautadze (born 31 October 2000) is a professional footballer who plays as a forward for  club Metz. Born in France, he plays for the Georgia national team.

Club career
Mikautadze started taking first steps in football at Gerland before he joined Olympique Nantes academy. In 2016, he moved to Metz football academy.

Mikautadze made his professional debut with Metz in a 4–1 Ligue 1 loss to Nice on 7 December 2019. On 10 December 2019, he signed his first professional contract with Metz, for four years.

In June 2020, Mikautadze was one of six Metz players to join Belgian First Division B side Seraing on loan. After his first nine matches with Seraing, he had scored 15 times, including four on his debut against Lommel. Overall, with 19 goals he became a joint topscorer of the season. He netted three goals in an aggregate 6–3 play-off victory over Waasland-Beveren. For his contribution to Seraign's successful league campaign, Mikautadze was named in Team of the Season and awarded Métallo d'Or, the title annually given to the best Seraign player, after the fanes had voted for him.

On 30 August 2021, he returned to Seraing on another loan, with the club now promoted to the Belgian top tier. The team ended up in the relegation zone, although it remained in the league due to the only goal scored by Mikautadze in the play-offs against Molenbeek.

In the summer of 2022, Mikautadze joined Metz again. His initial contract was due to expire in June 2023, but in 2021 it was extended until June 2025.

International career
He made a debut with the Georgia national team in a 1–0 2022 FIFA World Cup qualification loss to Sweden on 25 March 2021.

International goals
Scores and results list Georgia's goal tally first, score column indicates score after each Mikautadze goal.

Honours
Seraing

● 2020-21 Belgian First Division B runner-up

References

External links
 
 

2000 births
French people of Georgian descent
Living people
Footballers from Lyon
Footballers from Georgia (country)
Georgia (country) international footballers
French footballers
Association football forwards
FC Metz players
R.F.C. Seraing (1922) players
Ligue 1 players
Championnat National 3 players
Challenger Pro League players
Belgian Pro League players
Ligue 2 players
French expatriate footballers
Expatriate footballers from Georgia (country)
Expatriate footballers in Belgium